Allan Cook (30 October 1924 – 20 March 1989) was a New Zealand cricketer. He played in two first-class matches for Wellington from 1955 to 1957.

See also
 List of Wellington representative cricketers

References

External links
 

1924 births
1989 deaths
New Zealand cricketers
Wellington cricketers
Cricketers from Lower Hutt